Jessica Huot (born March 30, 1983, in Holyoke, Massachusetts) is a former competitive ice dancer for Finland. She teamed up with Juha Valkama in 1999. They are the 2002–04 Finnish national champions. Their highest placement at an ISU Championship was 18th at the 2004 Europeans in Budapest, Hungary.

Huot studied at the Massachusetts Institute of Technology.

Her brother Jonathan Huot is the chief financial officer of The Town Dock based out of Narragansett, RI.

Programs 
With Valkama

Results
GP: Grand Prix; JGP: Junior Grand Prix

With Valkama

References

External links 

 
 Ice Dance.com profile

Finnish female ice dancers
1983 births
Living people
Sportspeople from Holyoke, Massachusetts
American expatriate sportspeople in Finland